The Lemon Goby (Vomerogobius flavus) is a species of ray-finned fish, from the family Gobiidae. which is native to the marine waters around the Bahamas.

References

Gobiidae
Monotypic fish genera
Fish described in 1971